Çöl Ərəb (also, Çöl-erəb, Çölərəb, Chël’Arab, and Cholarb) is a village and municipality in the Kurdamir Rayon of Azerbaijan.

References 

Populated places in Kurdamir District